Shine is a Hong Kong Cantopop duo consisting of Chui Tien-you (徐天佑) and Wong You-nam (黃又南). They first signed with EMI and later  with Warner Music Hong Kong.  The band was Fruit Chan's answer to the male version of the group Twins.

In 2008, both members took roles in the movie La Lingerie.

Discography
2002
Boys On Film
Favorites
2003
Semi-Matured Boy
Natural Shine
2004
Shine
The Best Of Shine (New + Best Selection)
2006
Shine On
2013
Essentials (New + Best Selection)

Cantopop musical groups
Cantonese-language singers

Hong Kong idols
Hong Kong boy bands
Musical groups established in 2002
Musical groups disestablished in 2021
Pop music duos
Male musical duos